Stelios Iliadis (Greek: Στέλιος Ηλιάδης; born 3 June 1986) is a Greek footballer who plays as a midfielder for Agrotikos Asteras.

Club career

Apollon Kalamarias
He started his career in Apollon Kalamarias coming from the club's youth-system. Despite his relatively young age he played first-team football and appeared really mature which attracted the interest of bigger clubs.

PAOK
He was signed in the summer of 2005 by PAOK, for a fee of 250.000 euros and a percentage of his next sale. Shortly afterwards, he gained a starting spot in PAOK alongside club legend Theodoros Zagorakis. His best season to date is the 2006–2007 where he helped the team's cause scoring three goals also. In 2007–2008 season, and with new coach Fernando Santos preferring Sotiris Balafas and Lambros Vangelis at first and then Ricardo Matias Verón, he was restricted as a substitute but injury problems gave him the chance to play as a right defender where his performance regained his manager's faith in him.

The 2008–2009 season didn't start the best way for Iliadis. He played his first game coming as a late substitute against Levadiakos in the 7th matchday, wearing the PAOK captain's armband for the first time. He made his first start a few days later, in a game for the Greek Cup. He was released by PAOK after his contract expired.

Iraklis
On 5 August 2009 Iliadis signed a two-year contract with Iraklis, shortly after Nuno Piloto's (Iraklis' starting defensive midfielder) serious knee injury.

Kerkyra
On 2011 Iliadis signed with Kerkyra. Kerkyra on season 2012-2013 was relegated as finished on 16th position. The season 2013-2014 will be playing on Football League.

Lokomotiv Plovdiv
On 2013 he signed a one-year contract with the Bulgarian team Lokomotiv Plodviv. He made his debut with the team on 22 September in a 2-0 home victory against Pirin Gotse Delchev. He scored his first goal with the team on 31 October in a 2-3 home loss against Levski Sofia.

Panthrakikos
In January 2015 Iliadis signed with Panthrakikos. On 1 July 2015, he renew his contract with the club.

Veria
In the last day of the January 2017 transfer window, the experienced middlefielder signed a six months contract with the Superleague Greece club Veria after Panthrakikos administration's decision to withdraw from Football League due to financial reasons.

International career
He was part of the U19 football team while playing in Apollon Kalamarias and then of the Greece national under-21 football team earning more than 10 caps. He said that his big dream is to earn a spot in the Greece national football team and win the championship with PAOK F.C.

References

1986 births
Living people
Greek footballers
Greek expatriate footballers
PAOK FC players
Apollon Pontou FC players
Iraklis Thessaloniki F.C. players
A.O. Kerkyra players
PFC Lokomotiv Plovdiv players
Super League Greece players
First Professional Football League (Bulgaria) players
Expatriate footballers in Bulgaria
Footballers from Thessaloniki
Panthrakikos F.C. players
Association football midfielders
Greek expatriate sportspeople in Bulgaria